Eotomariidae is an extinct family of gastropods in the clade Vetigastropoda (according to the taxonomy of the Gastropoda by Bouchet & Rocroi, 2005).

Taxonomy 
This family consists of the following subfamilies (according to the taxonomy of the Gastropoda by Bouchet & Rocroi, 2005):
 Eotomariinae Wenz, 1938
 Eotomariini Wenz, 1938 - synonym: Liospirinae Knight, 1956
 Deseretospirini Gordon & Yochelson, 1987
 Glabrocingulini Gordon & Yochelson, 1987
 Ptychomphalinae Wenz, 1938
 Ptychomphalini Wenz, 1938
 Mourloniini Gordon & Dutro, 1960
 Neilsoniinae Knght, 1956
 Neilsoniini Knight, 1956
 Spirovallini Waterhouse, 2001

Genera 
Genera within the family Eotomariidae include:

Eotomariinae
 Bembexia Oehlert, 1888

tribe Eotomariini
 Eotomaria Ulrich & Scoffield, 1897
 Eotomaria sublaevis Ulrich, 1897

 Glabrocingulum Thomas, 1940 - but also being classified within the family Gosseletinidae
 Takfaia Ketwetsuriya, Nützel & Kanjanapayont, 2016
 Takfaia kuesi Ketwetsuriya, Nützel & Kanjanapayont, 2016
 Kamupena Speden, 1962
 Kamupena greggi Speden 1962 
 Paraliospira Rohr, 1980 
 Semizona Ebbestad & Peel, 2001
 Semizona bella Ebbestad & Peel, 2001 
 Semizona glindmeyeri Rohr, 1996

References

External links